The potential breakup of the United Kingdom following departure of Scotland (and Northern Ireland) is mentioned in media and by think tanks with regard to potential Scottish independence. The union of the Kingdom of Scotland and Kingdom of England into the Kingdom of Great Britain was formed in 1707. The union of the Kingdom of Great Britain with the Kingdom of Ireland was formed in 1801, to establish the United Kingdom of Great Britain and Ireland. Most of Ireland left in 1922, whereupon the UK became the United Kingdom of Great Britain and Northern Ireland.

Those opposing a breakup include English, Scottish, Welsh and Northern Irish unionists/loyalists. Those favouring dissolution include Scottish nationalists (who favour Scottish independence) and Irish nationalists and republicans (who favour a United Ireland). Welsh nationalists favour Welsh autonomy to varying degrees up to Welsh independence.

History

Formation

The United Kingdom was formed through various conquests and political unions. The Kingdom of England was formed by uniting England under Æthelstan, son of Edward the Elder in 927.

Wales
Edward I of England invaded Wales in 1276–77. Edward sought to end Welsh independence, establishing English rule in Wales, following the killing of Llywelyn ap Gruffudd, Prince of Wales in 1282 and Llywelyn's brother Dafydd ap Gruffydd in 1283. Edward then introduced the royal ordinance of the Statute of Rhuddlan in 1284, forming the Principality of Wales within the "Realm of England". The statute confirmed the annexation of Wales and introduced English common law to Wales for criminal cases, while civil cases were still dealt with under the Welsh laws of Hywel Dda. Henry VIII of England introduced the Laws in Wales Acts 1535-1542, integrating Wales into England. It abolished the Welsh legal system and the Welsh language's official status. The England–Wales border was also defined, and the first members representing constituencies in Wales were elected to the English parliament. The Marcher Lordships and Principality of Wales were also abolished. The Wales and Berwick Act 1746 declared "where England only is mentioned in any act of parliament, the same notwithstanding hath and shall be deemed to comprehend the dominion of Wales and town of Berwick upon Tweed", meaning England would be used as a term to describe England, Wales and the town of Berwick-upon-Tweed.

Kingdom of Scotland and Kingdom of England
On 22 July 1706, the Treaty of Union was agreed between representatives of the Scots Parliament and the Parliament of England. The following year, twin Acts of Union were passed by both parliaments to create the united Kingdom of Great Britain with effect from 1 May 1707 with popular opposition and anti-union riots in places such as Edinburgh and Glasgow. The newly formed Parliament of Great Britain rejected proposals from the Parliament of Ireland that the third kingdom be incorporated in the union at the time.

Ireland, then Northern Ireland
From the late 12th century, the Anglo-Norman invasion of Ireland resulted in English kings claiming control of much of the island of Ireland, although by the late Late Middle Ages it was reduced to an area around Dublin, known as the Pale. Under Poynings' Law of 1494, the Parliament of Ireland was prohibited from meeting without the consent of England's monarch and the Privy Council. In 1541, English King Henry VIII changed Ireland's status from a lordship to a kingdom, and proclaimed himself King of Ireland. The United Irishmen Rebellion of 1798, which sought to end British rule in Ireland failed, and the Acts of Union 1800 merged the Kingdom of Ireland with the Kingdom of Great Britain into a combined United Kingdom of Great Britain and Ireland.

In December 1921, the Anglo-Irish Treaty gave the island of Ireland complete independence in its home affairs and practical independence for foreign policy, but with an opt-out clause that would allow Northern Ireland to remain within the United Kingdom. As expected, the Parliament of Northern Ireland resolved on 7 December 1922 (the day after the establishment of the Irish Free State) to exercise its right to opt out of the Free State by making an address to King George V. (Ireland became a republic in 1949 and thereby left the Commonwealth.)

The "United Kingdom of Great Britain and Ireland" continued in name until 1927 when it was renamed the "United Kingdom of Great Britain and Northern Ireland" by the Royal and Parliamentary Titles Act 1927. The alternative name "United Kingdom of Great Britain and Ulster" was also proposed but did not gain support.

Between the late 1960s and 1998, an ethno-nationalist conflict known as "The Troubles" occurred in Northern Ireland. The sectarian conflict was fought between (mainly Protestant) Loyalists, advocating for Northern Ireland to remain in the United Kingdom, and (mainly Catholic) Republicans, advocating for a United Ireland. The conflict is usually deemed to have ended with the Good Friday Agreement of 1998.

Devolution 

In 1969, the Royal Commission on the Constitution was set up by Prime Minister Harold Wilson to examine the constitutional and economic relationships between various parts of the United Kingdom. It was launched following the success of the pro-independence parties, the Scottish National Party and Plaid Cymru, in by-elections between 1966 (Carmarthen) and 1967 (Hamilton). After the October 1974 United Kingdom general election Wilson's successor James Callaghan's Labour Government had only a majority of three, and by 1977 lost its majority from by-elections, therefore becoming vulnerable to demands from pro-independence parties. The commission recommended the establishment of elected bodies for Scotland and Wales. Referendums in Scotland and Wales were held in 1979; the Scottish result was a narrow 52% win, but did not meet the turnout requirement, and the Welsh result was an 80% rejection.

Devolution was re-introduced as part of the manifesto of the UK Labour Party which won power under Tony Blair in the 1997 United Kingdom general election. On 11 September 1997, the Scottish devolution referendum was put to the Scottish electorate and secured a majority (74.3%) in favour of the establishment of a new devolved Scottish Parliament, with tax-varying powers, in Edinburgh. A few days later on 18 September 1997, Wales held a similar referendum, with a narrow majority (50.3%) voting in favour of an assembly, which unlike the Scottish body, did not have primary legislative power at the time. On 22 May 1998, Northern Ireland voted in a referendum on whether to approve the Good Friday Agreement, which ended the Troubles and made provisions for the establishment of a Northern Ireland Assembly. It passed with 71% of the vote.

The first election to the assembly in Northern Ireland was held on 25 June 1998, whereas for the devolved bodies in Scotland and Wales, the first elections were held on 6 May 1999. Devolved powers in Northern Ireland were suspended between October 2002 and 8 May 2007.

Each devolved body has the authority to legislate in a field of competences known as "transferred matters" or "devolved matters". These matters include any competence not explicitly retained by the Parliament at Westminster. Powers reserved by Westminster are divided into "excepted matters", which it retains indefinitely, and "reserved matters", which may be transferred to the competence of the devolved bodies at a future date.

The Northern Ireland Assembly's composition and powers are laid down in the Northern Ireland Act 1998. The Assembly has both legislative powers and responsibility for electing the Northern Ireland Executive. The Government of Wales Act 1998 granted the formation of the National Assembly for Wales and granted it a significant number of new powers which included most of the powers previously held by the Secretary of State for Wales. The Scotland Act 1998, determined the powers and responsibilities of the Scottish Parliament. On 1 July 1999, the powers were transferred to the bodies in Scotland and Wales.

A 2011 referendum in Wales was held, with 63.5% of voters, on 35.6% turnout, voted in favour of awarding primary legislation powers to the Welsh Assembly. The Assembly was renamed "Senedd Cymru" or "the Welsh Parliament" ("Senedd") in 2020, to reflect its increased legislative powers.

21st century

Rise of the Scottish National Party 
Following the gradual decline and eventual collapse of Scottish Labour since the 2007 Scottish Parliament election, the pro-independence party, the Scottish National Party (SNP) has been gaining support. It won 28.7% of the vote in the very first Scottish Parliament election in 1999. In 2007, the SNP became the largest political party for the first time, winning one more seat than second placed Labour with 32.9% of the vote. The SNP won 45.4% at the 2011 Scottish Parliament election with a peak of 69 Members of the Scottish Parliament (MSP). Although winning fewer seats in the 2016 Scottish Parliament election under the new leadership of Nicola Sturgeon, the SNP percentage vote actually increased to 46.5%, and then increased again to 47.7% in the 2021 Scottish Parliament election with 64 MSP seats.

In Westminster elections, Scottish Labour declined to a single seat, a decrease of forty, in the 2015 United Kingdom general election in Scotland. With 56 of the 59 UK Parliament seats in Scotland going to the SNP.

Scottish independence referendum 

In 2014, a majority of 55% of Scottish voters voted to remain part of the UK in an independence referendum, with 45% voting for Scottish independence.

Impact of Brexit 

There were renewed calls for a Scottish independence referendum after the UK as a whole voted to leave the European Union in the 2016 Brexit referendum. Scotland on the other hand voted to remain in the EU by 62% to 38%.

The differing opinions of the four countries relating to Brexit is given as a reason for Scotland and Northern Ireland leaving the UK, in both of which a majority voted to remain in the European Union. The UK as a whole voted by 52% to leave, as did England and Wales. On the other hand, Scotland had voted 62% remain, and Northern Ireland 56% remain. Many leave supporters in England supported Scotland and Northern Ireland leaving the UK in order to secure Brexit.

Some academics have ascribed the European Union to have helped maintain the UK's constitutional arrangement.

In December 2018, an opinion poll showed in the event of a No-deal Brexit, a majority of those polled in Northern Ireland would vote to reunify with Ireland.

Northern Ireland Protocol 

The completion of the European Single Market in 1992 and the Good Friday Agreement in 1998 made it possible to dismantle what had previously been extensive border infrastructure between Northern Ireland and the Republic of Ireland.

After the Brexit negotiations in 2019, Prime Minister Johnson proposed what became the Northern Ireland Protocol, part of the EU–UK Trade and Cooperation Agreement. According to the protocol, Northern Ireland is formally outside the EU single market and inside the UK internal market, but EU free movement of goods rules and EU Customs Union rules still apply; this ensures there are no customs checks or controls between Northern Ireland and the Republic of Ireland (and thus the EU as a whole). In place of an Ireland/Northern Ireland land border, the protocol has created a  customs "Irish Sea border" for goods from (but not to) Great Britain, to the disquiet of prominent Unionists.

At the 2022 Northern Ireland Assembly election, Nationalists won 35 of the 90 seats, with Sinn Féin being the largest party. Some claimed the nationalist-win would lead to the collapse of the UK, although critics cite unionist MLAs outnumber nationalists. UK ministers rejected Unionist claims that a Sinn Féin-held First Minister in Northern Ireland would lead to a United Ireland.

COVID-19 pandemic 
Following the outbreak of the COVID-19 pandemic in the United Kingdom, polls for Scottish independence recorded a sustained period of support over 50% for Scottish independence over remaining in the United Kingdom, in some cases reversing the 2014 "no" vote. It has been argued that the differing responses to the pandemic by the Conservative UK Government managing health policy for England and the SNP Scottish Government managing health in Scotland has led to an increase in support for Scottish independence. The response of the Labour Government in Cardiff for Wales has also been supported over the UK Government with 62% in a June 2020 poll supporting the Welsh Government's response compared to 34% for the UK Government.

Pro-independence campaign groups said they have more members as there is a "growing feeling" that the devolved administrations in Edinburgh and Cardiff have handled the crisis better than Westminster. Critics stated that infection and death rates between Scotland, Wales and England "run along largely similar lines" but the devolved bodies were "far better at communicating, listening and empathising"; additionally the UK Furlough scheme was unlikely to be sufficiently financially supported by only Edinburgh and Cardiff.

Current system 

The United Kingdom is composed of four constituent countries: England, Northern Ireland, Scotland and Wales. It is a unitary parliamentary democracy and constitutional monarchy. The central parliament of the United Kingdom is located in Westminster, in London, England. The Parliament of the United Kingdom is sovereign. It is made up of the House of Commons, the House of Lords and the Monarchy. The main business of parliament takes place in the two houses, but royal assent is required for a bill to become an act of parliament (law). For general elections (elections to the House of Commons), the UK is divided into 650 constituencies, each of which is represented by a member of Parliament (MP). MPs hold office for up to five years and are always up for re-election in general elections. The prime minister is the head of government in the United Kingdom. In modern times, the prime minister is, by constitutional convention, an MP and is normally the leader of the political party with the most seats in the House of Commons and hold office by virtue of their ability to command the confidence of the House of Commons.

The Constitution of the United Kingdom is uncodified and consists mostly of a collection of disparate written sources, including statutes, judge-made case law and international treaties, together with constitutional conventions. The UK Parliament can carry out constitutional reform by passing acts of parliament, and thus has the political power to change or abolish almost any written or unwritten element of the constitution. No sitting parliament can pass laws that future parliaments cannot change.

The UK operates a system of devolution where power is transferred to the constituent countries of the UK. The original legislation for devolution were introduced by the Scotland Act 1998, the Government of Wales Act 1998 and the Northern Ireland Act 1998. This led to the establishment of devolved legislatures in the Scottish Parliament, Welsh Parliament (Senedd), and Northern Ireland Assembly, each with varying powers.

The devolved legislatures in Scotland, Wales and Northern Ireland are now permanent parts of the UK constitution. It is said that devolution has allowed further democratic expression and policy innovation in these three nations.

England accounts for 84% of the UK's population, and its economy is the largest. UK economic policy is largely based on the economic conditions of England. Scotland roughly accounts for 8.5%, Wales 5% and Northern Ireland 3% of the UK's population. The asymmetry between England and the other members of the United Kingdom has been voiced as a reason for its potential breakup.

Reasons for dissolution of the United Kingdom 

The reasons for breaking up the United Kingdom may be specific to each of the movement in the four countries, although overlapping reasons may exist, as well as general criticisms of how the UK and the UK government currently operates.

Some reasons expressed in multiple movements are listed below:

 National identity – decline in Britishness: A 2021 opinion poll showed a third of respondents in Scotland said they felt Scottish but not British. In a March 2020, Opinium Research poll, 46% of those polled in Britain felt both British and English/Welsh/Scottish/Irish, 37% identified more strongly with their home nation, and 21% more British. English Conservatives were more likely to identify as English than Labour voters who identified as more British. In Wales, it was reversed, Tory areas were more British than Welsh, with 46% of Labour areas and 40% of Wales stated "More Welsh". In Scotland, 57% felt more Scottish than British, compared to 26% equally Scottish-British, and 19% more British, whilst in Wales it is said that a majority feel some part British, leading to calls for the Welsh and Scottish pro-independence campaigns to "reclaim Britishness".
 Differing political ideologies – The different political parties and their ideologies in the devolved administrations and the UK Government, also managing many affairs for England has been voiced as a reason for a potential breakup. The centre-right Conservatives form the current UK Government, whereas in Scotland and Wales, Centre-left parties, the Scottish National Party and Welsh Labour respectively, hold power. Northern Ireland has a powersharing coalition, between unionists and nationalists.
 Boris Johnson – During his tenure, some critics of Johnson expressed concern that he endangered the union, stating his unpopularity in Scotland is "driving voters to back independence". In June 2022, his approval rating in Scotland was polled at 12%, with 83% dissatisfied, compared to 53% satisfied for Nicola Sturgeon. Under Johnson, the Joint Ministerial Committees of the UK Government and devolved governments "never met in full".
 Rise of English nationalism – Gavin Esler and Fintan O'Toole have argued that the rise in English nationalism was a force behind support for Brexit, would post a threat to the union it "may not survive". They believe the rise in Englishness was reactionary to the devolved bodies established in Scotland, Wales and Northern Ireland. Esler in particular states that even after "four centuries the United Kingdom had survived Scottish, Welsh and even violent Irish nationalism, but it may not survive the rise of English nationalism". Chris Patten, former Conservative Chairman described the Johnson government to be "English nationalist" that will "hasten the break-up of the union".
 Poor intergovernmental relations – Mark Drakeford, Welsh First Minister, stated that the "current [Johnson] UK Government [...] is instinctively hostile to devolution", and that "undermines the case for the Union rather than strengthens it". Boris Johnson was reportedly said Scottish devolution is a "disaster".
 Muscular unionism – a form of unionism stated by some to be exercised by the Johnson Conservative UK Government, involves various controversial strategies to promote the union, including by-passing devolved administrations to award funding relating to devolved areas, to include the UK flag on large infrastructure projects and requests for UK diplomats to stop referring to the UK as a union of four nations. The efforts have been criticised as being counter-productive and even encouraging independence.
 Potential EU membership – Since Brexit, many in Scotland in particular have called for a second independence referendum to have a chance to apply for EU membership. In the 2016 referendum, Scots voted majority to remain in the EU. Plaid Cymru, the largest Welsh pro-independence party, supports EU membership following the potential independence of Wales even though Wales voted for the UK's withdrawal. Some argue that some Scottish independence supporters are also against EU membership.
 Potential British Confederation membership – A British Confederation or a Confederal UK has been proposed as a concept of constitutional reform of the United Kingdom, in which the countries of the United Kingdom; England, Scotland, Wales, as well as Northern Ireland become separate sovereign groups or states that pool certain key resources within a confederal system.

Reasons for Independence movement in Scotland

  Democracy and self-determination
If Scotland were independent, Scotland's population would possess full decision-making power in regard to the political affairs of its nation. Alex Salmond stated in a May 2012 launch that "the people who live in Scotland are best placed to make the decisions that affect Scotland". The Conservative Party, which often forms the UK Government by winning general elections, has not won a plurality of seats in Scotland since 1955. Many nationalists have said this gives rise to a democratic deficit, as Scotland has only elected a majority of governing MPs in three of the 11 UK general elections since 1979. Devolution was intended to close this deficit, but Brexit, which happened despite 62% of voters in Scotland voting against it, has highlighted this concern. Furthermore, many in Scotland do not feel a national affinity to the UK. In a poll taken in early 2021 by Panelbase, a third of respondents in Scotland said they felt Scottish but not British.

 Nuclear disarmament 
With control over defence and foreign policy, an independent Scotland could demand the removal of Trident nuclear weapons, which are based in the Firth of Clyde. Nuclear disarmament is an issue long associated with the campaign for an independent Scotland, as outlined in the House of Commons Defence Committee's white paper "The future of the UK's strategic nuclear deterrent: the White Paper" of 2006–2007. The Scottish Campaign for Nuclear Disarmament supports independence on this basis.

 Oil resources
Nationalists argue that only an independent Scotland can fully utilise and exploit its national resources, including North Sea oil and gas, for the benefit of its population. According to the Scottish Government led by Alex Salmond in 2014, 64% of the EU's oil reserves existed in Scottish waters, while the David Hume Institute think tank estimated that "Scotland is sitting on oil and gas reserves worth up to £4 trillion". Investment in and production from the North Sea oilfields dropped sharply after Conservative chancellor George Osborne imposed punitive taxes, undercutting the projected revenue an independent Scotland could claim.

 Autonomous foreign policy
Under the Scottish Government's plans for winning the 2014 referendum, an independent Scotland would have become a full and equal member of the United Nations, NATO and the European Union and many other international organisations. With an autonomous voice in international politics, Scottish independence campaigners believe the nation's global influence would increase in regard to the defence of its national interests and the promotion of its values. Furthermore, Scottish embassies could be established globally to promote Scotland internationally, and to lobby other governments on the nation's behalf.

 Re-entering the EU
During the 2014 referendum, a major argument against independence was that Scotland would be outside the EU. Scotland is very supportive of EU membership, with 62% voting to remain in the 2016 EU referendum. Since Brexit, many have called for a second independence referendum to have a chance to re-enter the EU.

Opposition 

Supporters for the continuation for the United Kingdom oppose its breakup. Political parties, with seats in the House of Commons, opposing a breakup include:

 Conservative Party (UK)
 Labour Party (GB)
 Liberal Democrats (GB)
 Democratic Unionist Party (NI)

Response 
In 2021, UK Prime Minister Boris Johnson, announced his second ministry's various efforts to keep the union together. A solution described by Johnson's Scottish secretary Alister Jack as "Project Love", involves replacing formerly EU investment funds with a "shared prosperity fund" awarded to various local authorities in the United Kingdom. The fund will be managed by the UK Government and its civil service. The fund has been criticised for not involving the devolved governments. In June 2021, Johnson was claimed to be "not that interested" in the union by Dominic Cummings, Johnson's former advisor. Downing Street dismissed the claims. A Guardian editorial, described the UK Government may be hoping that separatist feeling is dispelled over time as long as the benefits of the UK are well enough advertised. The same article however stated that the Conservatives approach to maintaining their Northern England red wall seats involving "confected rows over flags, history and race" may "not resonate [with] Scots".

Others have stated that "unionism has singularly struggled to articulate its vision as to why Scottish voters should be persuaded".

In June 2021, Mark Drakeford, Welsh FM, announced a plan titled "Reforming Our Union" and described the UK as a "voluntary union"  "of England, Scotland, Wales and Northern Ireland [that] must be based on a partnership of equals", with devolution a "permanent feature". The plan had twenty ideas for the union including reform of the House of Lords into a constitutional body, centralised funding for devolved legislatures, respect for devolved matters, and devolution of justice and police to Wales inline with Scotland and Northern Ireland.

Controversial muscular unionism 
Pro-union approaches by the Johnson UK Government have been described as "Muscular unionism" or "know-your-place unionism". The strategy involves various strategies used to promote the union, with some described as controversial. This includes policies to by-pass the devolved administrations to award funding relating in devolved areas, the Internal Market Bill (described to roll back devolved powers), to include the UK flag on large infrastructure projects and requests for UK diplomats to stop referring to the UK as a union of four nations. Some media has stated that Johnson "made the calculation that most voters don't care which level of government delivers particular projects as long as things improve".

The efforts have been criticised as being counter-productive and even encouraging independence.

Some have described the approach to be an inevitable response to the failure of devolution as intended by the First Blair ministry to tackle the rise in separatism, or to support the notion of a British nation, and that the "centrifugal forces unleashed by devolution must be balanced by a centripetal role [...] [of] the British State".

Gordon Brown, former UK PM, stated that Johnson should stop his policy of "muscular unionism" as it would help the cause for Scottish independence. Ciaran Martin, involved in creating the framework for the 2014 Scottish referendum for the UK Government, stated that muscular unionism "is pushing forward a single, British nationalist vision of the future, working to shape government policy to realise it, and relying on an English electoral majority to deliver it. And if you don’t like it, know your place". Mark Drakeford, Welsh FM, clarified his government's support for the union but stated that "muscular unionism" was "bad for the UK", and that "raids on the powers of the Senedd is not the way to persuade people that the UK is a deal [that] they want".

Reasons for Unionism in Scotland 
Reasons for continuing the union can be summarised as follows:

 Currency – The entire United Kingdom uses the Pound sterling as its national currency, the British government has repeatedly stated that a constituent country leaving the union would not be able to continue using the pound. The pound is also one of the world's strongest currencies, being the 4th most exchanged currency on the foreign exchange market and the fourth most held reserve currency in the world. There have been fears in Scotland particularly that the SNP's proposal to transition to a new Scottish pound would be deeply unstable, and that the currency would be weak and worth vastly less than the current UK pound. The pound also has more value than countries with vastly larger economies than Britain, with it being worth more than the United States dollar.
 Business and the Economy – Scotland is heavily reliant on trade and the import/export of goods from the rest of the United Kingdom. 60% of all Scottish exports go to the rest of the country, in a market worth approximately £87.1 billion in 2019. Less than a quarter of overall exports go to the rest of the world, and only 19% go to the European Union. Import wise, this dependency is also further highlighted. In 2021, 67% of all Scottish imports originated from elsewhere in the UK. The advent of independence or subsequent Scottish EU membership would damage this trading relationship significantly as red tape would cause large problems for goods crossing the Anglo-Scottish border, leading to long delays and extreme price rises for consumers in Scotland. If Scotland pursued EU membership, the border would become a frontier between a member state and a non-member state, making any free trade agreement impossible. This would also cause significant damage to Scottish businesses, who are overwhelmingly dependent on membership in the UK single market, and major firms have threatened relocation if Scotland chose to leave the union. If delays along the border became extreme, some have speculated that Scotland could deal with food shortages and rationing. The effect of Scottish independence on trade has been likened to the effects of Brexit, although such effects would be vastly exacerbated due to Scotland's larger dependence on the rest of Britain as opposed to Britain's dependence on the EU.
 Security and the Armed Forces - Currently, Scotland benefits from a wide security and military apparatus as part of the UK. British intelligence agencies such as MI5, MI6, GCHQ and the NCA provide Scotland with the ability to monitor, stop and prevent criminal behaviour, engage in counter espionage and counter terrorism, and provide protection to vulnerable individuals. In some fields, Police Scotland heavily relies on the support of these services to prevent and investigate crime in Scotland. The British Armed Forces also has a large precense in Scotland with military personnel and bases across the country employing tens of thousands of staff, soldiers, seamen and airmen. This includes 12,500 active military personnel, 4,250 in the Army Reserve, and 4,000 MoD employees. These jobs would likely be lost over time in the event of Scottish independence, as the British military ceased to serve as Scotland's military. One of Britain's most important naval bases, and the centre of the nation's nuclear submarine fleet, HMNB Clyde additionally employees thousands of Scots and is of great strategic importance for NATO and British military policy. If Scotland were to become an independent country, this base would likely have to remain as there is no alternative to its operational capabilities elsewhere in the UK. This would make it a foreign base on Scottish soil, and Scotland would lose all input into how it runs and policy surrounding it. This opens up similar problems for other British military bases across Scotland. Scottish shipbuilding would also likely take a massive hit as Glasgow and Rosyth shipyards would lose their contracts for building ships for the Royal Navy, potentially costing thousands of jobs.
 Nationality and Identity - The vast majority of people living in Scotland are natural born or naturalised British citizens. This grants Scots unrestricted right of abode and treatment as full resident nationals across the UK and some British overseas territories. While both the UK and Scottish governments have pledged that all current British citizens will be able to keep their nationality in the event of Scottish independence, this may not necessarily apply to all future generations. This means that not all future generations, including potentially children and grandchildren, would be entitled to British citizenship in an independent Scotland. This would mean losing access to British consular protection overseas, British passports, which are currently ranked 5th or 6th in the world for visa-free travel. Citizens of an independent Scotland may also lose the right to enter the remaining UK without a visa, particularly if Scotland rejoins the EU and they become EU citizens. It would also mean they would no longer hold important political office in Britain, lose the right to vote in the UK and serve in the British Armed Forces. Scottish citizens in the UK would be treated as foreign nationals and would have less rights than their parents or grandparents who are British citizens. Outside the issue of legal citizenship, national identiy and how people identify with their nation(s) is also an important issue. Excluding census data, which only deals in absolutes on the matter of national identity, around half of the Scottish population reliably feel a British national identity to varying degrees of strength. This idea is corroborated by polling data which has shown that Scotland is nearly 50/50 split on the issue of independence, an issue which national identity is inextricably linked to. Including 2011 Census data, over a quarter of the Scottish population said they held some form of British identity, and when forced to choose between "Scottish" and "British", 39% chose British and 57% chose Scottish. 
Additional argument that have been made by the Better Together campaign include:
 Security – Scotland's security is "strengthened" as part of the United Kingdom.
 Two parliaments – Part of both Scottish Parliament and UK Parliament.
 Economy – "Size, strength and stability of the UK economy".
 New business orders – The UK is "better placed" than Scotland to "win new orders" for businesses
 Connections – Some people have family and friends either side of Anglo-Scottish border, (although independence may not affect travel).
 Society and culture – Scotland's society and culture "will be enriched" as part of the UK.

Alternatives 

 Devolution system reform– A The Economist article argued that "a better combination of devolution and centralisation would compel governments to work together". The author argues that the existing devolution settlement "is making the United Kingdom chronically miserable", as politics in Scotland and Northern Ireland are "dominated by unresolved arguments about the constitution", neglecting local issues, such as healthcare and schooling. The editor suggests that powers were "crudely handed out" to devolved bodies and the resulting politics "favour blaming the centre [Westminster] rather than working with it". Leading to clashes over issues such as new nuclear power stations or gas drilling as energy policy is reserved to Westminster but planning is devolved. An "exchange" of powers to allow for better co-ordination, such as increasing devolved say over immigration and EU relations in return for increased UK-devolved cooperation in major transport links and energy security, as well as direct Westminster involvement in devolution failings over health and education, was advocated.
 Federal system – Federalism in the United Kingdom has been touted as an alternative political system to prevent a possible breakup.

Apathy
Some in England have argued, the contentious Barnett formula and West Lothian question would be solved through the breakup of the union.

In October 2017, 88% of leave voters polled would accept a "yes" vote win in a second Scottish independence referendum in return for Brexit, 81% of the same leave voters also saw destabilising the Northern Ireland peace process to be "worthwhile" to guarantee Brexit. Among leave voters, those supporting the Conservatives were more likely to support Scotland independence and Northern Ireland's peace process destabilised than Labour leave voters, although still a majority of Labour leave voters.

In 2018, polled voters in England stated by 62% they would want money raised in England spent in England and not in Northern Ireland, with 73% of Conservatives and 22% of Labour voters supporting this view. HM Treasury in 2018, gave £10.8 billion annually to Northern Ireland, compared to £8.6 billion annually to the EU.

In June 2019, a YouGov poll showed a majority of members of the UK-ruling Conservative Party would support Scotland and Northern Ireland breaking up the UK to achieve Brexit.

A November 2019 poll, showed collectively 58% of Leave voters across the UK were supportive of Scottish independence, this was composed of 41% of voters who would accept it, if it were the price for Brexit, and 17% of Leave voters would support Scottish independence regardless of circumstance. In the same poll, UK Leave voters were also asked on Welsh independence, with 28% yes to Welsh independence to 26% no, and for a United Ireland with 25% yes to 19% no, if these scenarios were the price to pay for Brexit.

A May 2021 poll, commissioned by The Daily Telegraph, showed only 32% of English voters were opposed to Scottish independence, with 25% supporting and 30% no strong opinion/opposition. A majority of those aged 18–34 believe an independent Scotland would "thrive", compared to only 19% of those over 55.

The Yorkshire Post argued Scottish independence would benefit England and give needed funds spent in Scotland to Yorkshire.

Legal procedure
The order of breaking up the UK is debated in media, some state that Scotland is the most likely to leave, followed by a United Ireland, whose movement is bolstered by Scotland. Wales is sometimes perceived to be the last. In March 2021, a poll revealed 44% of respondents in Northern Ireland, thought Scottish independence would make an Irish border poll more likely.

Independence referendum process

Constitutional arrangements are reserved to the UK parliament. In January 2012, the UK Coalition government launched a consultation in facilitating a "legal, fair and decisive referendum" on Scottish independence. In October 2012, the Edinburgh Agreement was signed by UK Prime Minister David Cameron and Scottish First Minister Alex Salmond, transferring the power to hold an independence referendum in 2014 to the Scottish Parliament. The Scottish Independence Referendum Act 2013, an Act of the Scottish Parliament set out how the 2014 referendum operated.

The UK Government stated that, if a simple majority of the votes cast were in favour of independence, then "Scotland would become an independent country after a process of negotiations". If the majority was against independence, Scotland would continue to be a part of the United Kingdom. In the event of a majority for Yes, the Scottish Government had proposed an independence date of 24 March 2016. It was suggested that, following the conclusion of negotiations, the UK Parliament would legislate for Scottish independence to take place on the date that had been negotiated.

Calls for a second Scottish independence referendum have been rejected by the UK Government. In January 2021, Boris Johnson stated that a referendum should be a "once-in-a-generation", and that the 41-year gap between the referendums on the European Communities/Union between 1975 and 2016, was "a good sort of gap". On 28 June 2022, Scottish Government proposed 19 October 2023 to be a proposed date for a referendum, and published a draft "Scottish Independence Referendum Bill" the same day. The Scottish Government asked Boris Johnson for formal consent for the referendum but Johnson has refused calls for a referendum, stating "now is not the time". Dorothy Bain Lord Advocate for Scotland, stated she is concerned that the recent proposals for a referendum may be unlawful.

There has not been a referendum held on independence in Wales. Adam Price, leader of pro-independence Plaid Cymru has advocated for a referendum. Price stated a referendum would be held "within five years" if Plaid Cymru won a majority in 2021 Senedd election. Plaid Cymru later gained one seat totaling thirteen, but their vote share decreased, and with Labour retaining power. In March 2022, Price admitted independence would take "longer than we would hope".

United Ireland referendum process 
The Northern Ireland Act 1998, a statute of the Parliament of the United Kingdom, provides that Northern Ireland will remain within the United Kingdom unless a majority of the people of Northern Ireland vote to form part of a united Ireland. It specifies that the Secretary of State for Northern Ireland "shall exercise the power [to hold a referendum] if at any time it appears likely to him that a majority of those voting would express a wish that Northern Ireland should cease to be part of the United Kingdom and form part of a united Ireland". Such referendums may not take place within seven years of each other.

Potential aftermath following Scottish independence

In the event of Scottish independence, some media have suggested a potential domino effect, galvanising independence movements elsewhere in Europe. Some have described such an event as the "end of the British Empire" and may encourage the movement for a United Ireland.

In 2022, a research study stated 89% of the business owners consulted saw a UK breakup being "a significant threat" to the successful prospect of their business.

Inter-Britain borders 
The First Minister of Scotland has said that a trade border would form on the Anglo-Scottish border due to 'regulatory and customs requirements’ placed on Scotland if it rejoins the EU. A Welsh Liberal Democrats candidate claimed if Wales were independent, passport checks would be needed on the England–Wales border. The UK accounts for 60% of Scottish exports, and rejoining the EU would mean Scotland leaves the customs union and single market of the United Kingdom, increasing the cost of trade.

Michael Keating has argued Common Travel Area between the Republic of Ireland and United Kingdom can extend to an independent Scotland. Jess Sargeant of the Institute for Government, argued Brexit checks taking place in Kent would potentially be replicated along the Anglo-Scottish border with a potentially EU-member Scotland.

International standing 
The break-up of the union following the departure of Scotland, which has 8% the UK's population and a third of its landmass, has been described to have a "huge impact on the UK's role in the world". Others have argued that independence movements "undermine Britain's power abroad" and with the "numerous distractions" eliminated by a successful break up.

NATO 
Currently, the Scottish Government and first minister of Scotland supports NATO membership in the event of Scottish independence but is opposed to the UK's nuclear bases housed in Scotland. SNP's defence spokesman Stewart McDonald has said "I'm not suggesting for a minute that we would turn our backs on what's expected of us as an alliance member but we very clearly wouldn't become a permanent base for nuclear weapons". The SNP notes that countries such as Finland and Sweden are currently in the process of joining NATO and do not have nuclear weapons. The UK would also retain its NATO membership, however in the event of Scottish Independence would likely have to relocate its Trident Nuclear Programme. The Republic of Ireland,  is not part of NATO. The Senedd in Wales currently has a majority of ministers that supports NATO membership. Plaid Cymru is opposed to nuclear weapons and therefore according to leader Adam Price, NATO membership.

UK's nuclear arsenal in Scotland 
The proposed removal of nuclear weapons from an independent Scotland as requested by an independent SNP-led Scottish Government, has been described as a potential "geopolitical catastrophe". The UK may be faced with a difficult decision on where to house its nuclear arsenal outside Scotland, and may question keeping it at all over relocation expenses. The UK without nuclear weapons have been described to "destroy [...] the UK's diplomatic and military capability in the international arena, depriving the US of one of its most important and long-standing allies".

United Nations 
In the event of independence, Scotland and Wales would have to apply for UN membership, whereas Northern Ireland would likely be integrated with existing member Ireland. This would likely be a simple formality of applying and being accepted following a legal procedure with the recognition of the UK Government. The UK would also retain its UN membership and security council seat. Some have argued that a break-up of the UK would increase calls for reform of the United Nations Security Council, with a rump state UK's seat increasingly questioned. However, any reform would require the support of all five permanent members of the United Nations Security Council including the successor to the UK, which like Russia (inheriting from Soviet Union) would likely retain their seat if they are recognised as the UK's successor state. Some independence supporters have argued an independent Scotland would gain a temporary seat at the Security Council, as have European countries such as Ireland and Norway, although Scotland will no longer influence the UK's permanent veto.

Commonwealth 
Prior to the EU referendum, an op-ed in The Independent theorised that Brexit may indirectly cause the Commonwealth of Nations, which the British Monarch currently leads, to face questions on its future should the UK potentially breakup.

Flag 

Media outlets have speculated what would happen to, specifically the design, of the Union Jack (also known as the Union Flag), the flag of the United Kingdom. The flag is composed of St Andrew's Saltire (for Scotland) intersecting with a Saint Patrick's Saltire (Kingdom of Ireland), overlaid by St George's Cross (Kingdom of England, which included Wales). The College of Arms of England, Wales and Northern Ireland stated in 2013, that the flag did not require a redesign in the event of Scottish independence as it was expected that the Queen Elizabeth II would remain head of state of an independent Scotland. During the 2014 Scottish referendum, proposals for replacing St Andrew's Saltire with some Welsh or no element were proposed.

Any resulting changes to the Union Jack may increase calls for changes to flags which use the Union Jack in canton, in the top-left, such as Australia, and New Zealand. Fiji and Tuvalu previously removed the Union Jack from their flags, but later reverted the decision with Tuvalu reverting in 1997 and Fiji in 2016.

English identity and impact 
Some academics have argued the break-up of the United Kingdom would rebirth English national identity, which has been subsumed into the wider British national identity. England accounts for 85% of the UK's population and has big soft power on its own. There is some speculation over what role England may take following a potential UK breakup, whether England will inherit many of the former UK's responsibilities or retreat from the world stage and become isolationist.

Confederation of independent states 

Proposals for a looser organisation after a possible break-up have been put forward, such as a confederation encompassing what potentially would be the former United Kingdom. A confederal proposal advocates that the national parliaments of the currently constituent parts of the United Kingdom; England, Scotland, Wales, and Northern Ireland become independent sovereign states that share policies such as rights of movement, residence, employment in neighbouring countries, internal trade, use of currencies, defence, and foreign relations, although subject to negotiation, within a confederation. A Confederal Assembly will hold no powers to implement confederal policies, with each independent country responsible for implementation.

Opinion polling

Support 

 Scottish independence – Support for Scottish independence was 28% versus 57% against in 2011. In October 2020, support reached a high of 58% in favour of Scottish independence. A May 2022 Scottish independence opinion poll showed a 1% lead for remaining in the UK (45% for independence vs 46% against). In 2021, think-tank BritainThinks showed that with ‘don’t knows’ removed, 59% of people across the UK thought that Scotland would vote to become independent “in the next year or so”.
 United Ireland – A 2017 poll in Northern Ireland showed 27% in favour of Irish reunification versus 52% against. An April 2022 Northern Ireland opinion poll on a United Ireland showed a 16.2% lead for remaining in the UK (31.9% for a United Ireland vs 48.2% against).
A June 2022 poll on Welsh independence showed a 25% lead for remaining in the UK (25% for independence vs 50% against).

See also 
 British Empire
Partition of Belgium
 Dissolution of the Soviet Union
 Dissolution of the union between Norway and Sweden
 Dissolution of Russia
 Nationalisms and regionalisms of Spain
 Kosovo independence precedent
 2017 Catalan independence referendum

Notes

References

Separatism in the United Kingdom
Partition (politics)
Dissolutions of countries
Public policy proposals